Perla Patricia Bárcenas is a Mexican Paralympic powerlifter. She represented Mexico at the Summer Paralympics in 2000, 2008, 2012, 2016 and 2021 and she won three medals. She won the silver medal in the women's 75 kg event at the 2000 Summer Paralympics in Sydney, Australia, the bronze medal in the women's 82.5 kg event in 2008 and the bronze medal in the women's +82.5 kg event in 2012.

In 2016, she finished in 4th place in the women's 79 kg event at the 2016 Summer Paralympics held in Rio de Janeiro, Brazil. At the 2017 World Para Powerlifting Championships held in Mexico City, Mexico, she won the bronze medal in the women's 86+ kg event.

She finished in 4th place in the women's +86 kg event at the 2020 Summer Paralympics held in Tokyo, Japan. A few months later, she won the bronze medal in her event at the 2021 World Para Powerlifting Championships held in Tbilisi, Georgia.

References

External links 
 

1971 births
20th-century Mexican people
20th-century Mexican women
21st-century Mexican people
21st-century Mexican women
Living people
Medalists at the 2000 Summer Paralympics
Medalists at the 2008 Summer Paralympics
Medalists at the 2011 Parapan American Games
Medalists at the 2012 Summer Paralympics
Medalists at the 2015 Parapan American Games
Medalists at the 2019 Parapan American Games
Paralympic bronze medalists for Mexico
Paralympic medalists in powerlifting
Paralympic powerlifters of Mexico
Powerlifters at the 2000 Summer Paralympics
Powerlifters at the 2008 Summer Paralympics
Powerlifters at the 2012 Summer Paralympics
Powerlifters at the 2016 Summer Paralympics
Powerlifters at the 2020 Summer Paralympics
Sportspeople from Mexico City